Rosalind Appleby (born 30 September 1979) is an Australian music journalist and author.

Life and career 
Rosalind Appleby studied music at the University of Western Australia and graduated with a Bachelor of Music Performance (clarinet) in 2002. She is a music critic for The West Australian newspaper where her reviews and articles cover classical, jazz and world music.

Her book, Women of Note; the Rise of Australian Women Composers (published by Fremantle Press in 2012), revealed that 25% of Australian composers are women, more than almost any other country in the world. Women of Note documents the stories and music of twenty Australian women composers, spanning the twentieth century to present day.

Appleby has contributed to a variety of national and international publications including the Financial Times, Opera, The Australian, Scoop magazine, and The Opera Critic.

References

Notes

Sources 
Australian Music Centre database 
"Women of composure" The West Australian newspaper published 21 February 2012
Australian Book Review Women of Note https://www.australianbookreview.com.au/sponsors/67-march-2012/801-rosalind-appleby-women-of-note 
Sydney Morning Herald Women of Note review http://www.smh.com.au/entertainment/books/songs-of-praise-20120614-20b3r.html

External links 
Rosalind Appleby's website
Fremantle Press website

University of Western Australia alumni
Australian women journalists
Australian journalists